Caucasus 2020 (also called Kavkaz 2020) was a multinational command post exercise in Russia. The exercise took place from September 21 to 26.

The issues practiced in the course of the Kavkaz 2020 cover command and control of groups of troops, formations and subunits in joint operations to localize and resolve armed conflicts related to countering terrorism.

The participation of military contingents of nine foreign countries was planned. Nine more countries would send military observers to Russia.

The main actions would unfold at the Kapustin Yar and Ashuluk training grounds, as well as in the waters of the Black and Caspian Seas.

China, Armenia, Belarus, Iran, Myanmar, and Pakistan took part in the exercise.

India cancelled participation entirely, while Azerbaijan also cancelled participation but sent observers.

Participants

References

See also
Caucasus 2009

2020 in Russia
Military exercises involving Russia
Military exercises involving Iran
2020 in military history
Pakistan–Russia relations